Ed Kostenuk (October 12, 1925 in Victoria, British Columbia – September 2, 1997) is a former USAC IndyCar racecar driver.

He made six starts from 1962 to 1964 with a best finish of eleventh place. He failed to qualify for the 1962 Indianapolis 500.

See also
List of Canadians in Champ Car

References

Career Stats

1925 births
1997 deaths
Racing drivers from British Columbia
Sportspeople from Victoria, British Columbia